Water resources are natural resources of water that are potentially useful for humans, for example as a source of drinking water supply or irrigation water. 97% of the water on the Earth is salt water and only three percent is fresh water; slightly over two thirds of this is frozen in glaciers and polar ice caps. The remaining unfrozen freshwater is found mainly as groundwater, with only a small fraction present above ground or in the air. Natural sources of fresh water include surface water, under river flow, groundwater and frozen water. Artificial sources of fresh water can include treated wastewater (wastewater reuse) and desalinated seawater. Human uses of water resources include agricultural, industrial, household, recreational and environmental activities.

Water resources are under threat from water scarcity, water pollution, water conflict and climate change. Fresh water is a renewable resource, yet the world's supply of groundwater is steadily decreasing, with depletion occurring most prominently in Asia, South America and North America, although it is still unclear how much natural renewal balances this usage, and whether ecosystems are threatened. The framework for allocating water resources to water users (where such a framework exists) is known as water rights.

Natural sources of fresh water 

Natural sources of fresh water include surface water, under river flow, groundwater and frozen water.

Surface water 

Surface water is water in a river, lake or fresh water wetland. Surface water is naturally replenished by precipitation and naturally lost through discharge to the oceans, evaporation, evapotranspiration and groundwater recharge. The only natural input to any surface water system is precipitation within its watershed. The total quantity of water in that system at any given time is also dependent on many other factors. These factors include storage capacity in lakes, wetlands and artificial reservoirs, the permeability of the soil beneath these storage bodies, the runoff characteristics of the land in the watershed, the timing of the precipitation and local evaporation rates. All of these factors also affect the proportions of water loss.

Humans often increase storage capacity by constructing reservoirs and decrease it by draining wetlands. Humans often increase runoff quantities and velocities by paving areas and channelizing the stream flow.

Natural surface water can be augmented by importing surface water from another watershed through a canal or pipeline. 

Brazil is estimated to have the largest supply of fresh water in the world, followed by Russia and Canada.

Water from glaciers 
Glacier runoff is considered to be surface water. The Himalayas, which are often called "The Roof of the World", contain some of the most extensive and rough high altitude areas on Earth as well as the greatest area of glaciers and permafrost outside of the poles. Ten of Asia's largest rivers flow from there, and more than a billion people's livelihoods depend on them. To complicate matters, temperatures there are rising more rapidly than the global average. In Nepal, the temperature has risen by 0.6 degrees Celsius over the last decade, whereas globally, the Earth has warmed approximately 0.7 degrees Celsius over the last hundred years.

Groundwater

Under river flow 
Throughout the course of a river, the total volume of water transported downstream will often be a combination of the visible free water flow together with a substantial contribution flowing through rocks and sediments that underlie the river and its floodplain called the hyporheic zone. For many rivers in large valleys, this unseen component of flow may greatly exceed the visible flow. The hyporheic zone often forms a dynamic interface between surface water and groundwater from aquifers, exchanging flow between rivers and aquifers that may be fully charged or depleted. This is especially significant in karst areas where pot-holes and underground rivers are common.

Artificial sources of usable water 
Artificial sources of fresh water can include treated wastewater (reclaimed water), atmospheric water generators, and desalinated seawater. However, economic and environmental side effects of these technologies must also be taken into consideration.

Wastewater reuse

Desalinated water

Research into other options

Air-capture over oceans 

Researchers proposed "significantly increasing freshwater through the capture of humid air over oceans" to address present and, especially, future water scarcity/insecurity.

Atmospheric water generators on land 

A potentials-assessment study proposed hypothetical portable solar-powered atmospheric water harvesting devices which are under development, along with design criteria, finding they could help a billion people to access safe drinking water, albeit such off-the-grid generation may sometimes "undermine efforts to develop permanent piped infrastructure" among other problems.

Water uses 
The total quantity of water available at any given time is an important consideration. Some human water users have an intermittent need for water. For example, many farms require large quantities of water in the spring, and no water at all in the winter. To supply such a farm with water, a surface water system may require a large storage capacity to collect water throughout the year and release it in a short period of time. Other users have a continuous need for water, such as a power plant that requires water for cooling. To supply such a power plant with water, a surface water system only needs enough storage capacity to fill in when average stream flow is below the power plant's need. Nevertheless, over the long term the average rate of precipitation within a watershed is the upper bound for average consumption of natural surface water from that watershed.

Agriculture and other irrigation

It is estimated that 70% of worldwide water is used for irrigation, with 15–35% of irrigation withdrawals being unsustainable. It takes around 2,000 – 3,000 litres of water to produce enough food to satisfy one person's daily dietary need. This is a considerable amount, when compared to that required for drinking, which is between two and five litres. To produce food for the now over 7 billion people who inhabit the planet today requires the water that would fill a canal ten metres deep, 100 metres wide and 2100 kilometres long.

An assessment of water management in agriculture sector was conducted in 2007 by the International Water Management Institute in Sri Lanka to see if the world had sufficient water to provide food for its growing population. It assessed the current availability of water for agriculture on a global scale and mapped out locations suffering from water scarcity. It found that a fifth of the world's people, more than 1.2 billion, live in areas of physical water scarcity, where there is not enough water to meet all demands.  A further 1.6 billion people live in areas experiencing economic water scarcity, where the lack of investment in water or insufficient human capacity make it impossible for authorities to satisfy the demand for water. The report found that it would be possible to produce the food required in future, but that continuation of today's food production and environmental trends would lead to crises in many parts of the world. To avoid a global water crisis, farmers will have to strive to increase productivity to meet growing demands for food, while industry and cities find ways to use water more efficiently.

In some areas of the world, irrigation is necessary to grow any crop at all, in other areas it permits more profitable crops to be grown or enhances crop yield.  Various irrigation methods involve different trade-offs between crop yield, water consumption and capital cost of equipment and structures. Irrigation methods such as furrow and overhead sprinkler irrigation are usually less expensive but are also typically less efficient, because much of the water evaporates, runs off or drains below the root zone.  Other irrigation methods considered to be more efficient include drip or trickle irrigation, surge irrigation, and some types of sprinkler systems where the sprinklers are operated near ground level.  These types of systems, while more expensive, usually offer greater potential to minimize runoff, drainage and evaporation.  Any system that is improperly managed can be wasteful, all methods have the potential for high efficiencies under suitable conditions, appropriate irrigation timing and management.  Some issues that are often insufficiently considered are salinization of groundwater and contaminant accumulation leading to water quality declines.

As global populations grow, and as demand for food increases, there are efforts under way to learn how to produce more food with less water, through improvements in irrigation  methods  and technologies, agricultural water management, crop types, and water monitoring. Aquaculture is a small but growing agricultural use of water.  Freshwater commercial fisheries may also be considered as agricultural uses of water, but have generally been assigned a lower priority than irrigation (see Aral Sea and Pyramid Lake).

Changing landscape for the use of agriculture has a great effect on the flow of fresh water. Changes in landscape by the removal of trees and soils changes the flow of fresh water in the local environment and also affects the cycle of fresh water. As a result, more fresh water is stored in the soil which benefits the agriculture. However, since agriculture is the human activity that consumes the most fresh water, this can put a severe strain on local freshwater resources resulting in the destruction of local ecosystems.

In Australia, over-abstraction of fresh water for intensive irrigation activities has caused 33% of the land area to be at risk of salination.

Irrigation of green spaces and golf courses

Urban green spaces and golf courses usually require some form of irrigation. Golf courses are often targeted as using excessive amounts of water, especially in drier regions. Many golf courses utilize either primarily or exclusively treated effluent water, which has little impact on potable water availability.

Industries  

It is estimated that 22% of worldwide water is used in industry.  Major industrial users include hydroelectric dams, thermoelectric power plants, which use water for cooling, ore and oil refineries, which use water in chemical processes, and manufacturing plants, which use water as a solvent. Water withdrawal can be very high for certain industries, but consumption is generally much lower than that of agriculture.

Water is used in renewable power generation. Hydroelectric power derives energy from the force of water flowing downhill, driving a turbine connected to a generator. This hydroelectricity is a low-cost, non-polluting, renewable energy source. Significantly, hydroelectric power can also be used for load following unlike most renewable energy sources which are intermittent. Ultimately, the energy in a hydroelectric power plant is supplied by the sun. Heat from the sun evaporates water, which condenses as rain in higher altitudes and flows downhill. Pumped-storage hydroelectric plants also exist, which use grid electricity to pump water uphill when demand is low, and use the stored water to produce electricity when demand is high.

Hydroelectric power plants generally require the creation of a large artificial lake. Evaporation from this lake is higher than evaporation from a river due to the larger surface area exposed to the elements, resulting in much higher water consumption. The process of driving water through the turbine and tunnels or pipes also briefly removes this water from the natural environment, creating water withdrawal. The impact of this withdrawal on wildlife varies greatly depending on the design of the power plant.

Pressurized water is used in water blasting and water jet cutters. Also, very high pressure water guns are used for precise cutting. It works very well, is relatively safe, and is not harmful to the environment. It is also used in the cooling of machinery to prevent overheating, or prevent saw blades from overheating. This is generally a very small source of water consumption relative to other uses.

Water is also used in many large scale industrial processes, such as thermoelectric power production, oil refining, fertilizer production and other chemical plant use, and natural gas extraction from shale rock. Discharge of untreated water from industrial uses is pollution. Pollution includes discharged solutes (chemical pollution) and increased water temperature (thermal pollution). Industry requires pure water for many applications and utilizes a variety of purification techniques both in water supply and discharge. Most of this pure water is generated on site, either from natural freshwater or from municipal grey water. Industrial consumption of water is generally much lower than withdrawal, due to laws requiring industrial grey water to be treated and returned to the environment. Thermoelectric power plants using cooling towers have high consumption, nearly equal to their withdrawal, as most of the withdrawn water is evaporated as part of the cooling process. The withdrawal, however, is lower than in once-through cooling systems.

Drinking water and domestic use (households) 

It is estimated that 8% of worldwide water use is for domestic purposes. These include drinking water, bathing, cooking, toilet flushing, cleaning, laundry and gardening. Basic domestic water requirements have been estimated by Peter Gleick at around 50 liters per person per day, excluding water for gardens.

Drinking water is water that is of sufficiently high quality so that it can be consumed or used without risk of immediate or long term harm. Such water is commonly called potable water. In most developed countries, the water supplied to domestic, commerce and industry is all of drinking water standard even though only a very small proportion is actually consumed or used in food preparation.

844 million people still lacked even a basic drinking water service in 2017. Of those, 159 million people worldwide drink water directly from surface water sources, such as lakes and streams.

One in eight people in the world do not have access to safe water. Inappropriate use of water may contribute to this problem. The following tables provide some indicators of water use.

Environment 

Explicit environment water use is also a very small but growing percentage of total water use. Environmental water may include water stored in impoundments and released for environmental purposes (held environmental water), but more often is water retained in waterways through regulatory limits of abstraction. Environmental water usage includes watering of natural or artificial wetlands, artificial lakes intended to create wildlife habitat, fish ladders, and water releases from reservoirs timed to help fish spawn, or to restore more natural flow regimes.

Environmental usage is non-consumptive but may reduce the availability of water for other users at specific times and places. For example, water release from a reservoir to help fish spawn may not be available to farms upstream, and water retained in a river to maintain waterway health would not be available to water abstractors downstream.

Recreation 

Recreational water use is mostly tied to lakes, dams, rivers or oceans. If a water reservoir is kept fuller than it would otherwise be for recreation, then the water retained could be categorized as recreational usage. Examples are anglers, water skiers, nature enthusiasts and swimmers.

Recreational usage is usually non-consumptive. However, recreational usage may reduce the availability of water for other users at specific times and places.  For example, water retained in a reservoir to allow boating in the late summer is not available to farmers during the spring planting season.  Water released for whitewater rafting may not be available for hydroelectric generation during the time of peak electrical demand.

Challenges and threats 
Threats for the availability of water resources include: Water scarcity, water pollution, water conflict and climate change.

Water scarcity

Water pollution

Water conflict

Climate change

Water resource management 

Water resource management is the activity of planning, developing, distributing and managing the optimum use of water resources. It is an aspect of water cycle management. The field of water resources management will have to continue to adapt to the current and future issues facing the allocation of water. With the growing uncertainties of global climate change and the long-term impacts of past management actions, this decision-making will be even more difficult. It is likely that ongoing climate change will lead to situations that have not been encountered. As a result, alternative management strategies, including participatory approaches and adaptive capacity are increasingly being used to strengthen water decision-making.

Ideally, water resource management planning has regard to all the competing demands for water and seeks to allocate water on an equitable basis to satisfy all uses and demands. As with other resource management, this is rarely possible in practice so decision-makers must prioritise issues of sustainability, equity and factor optimisation (in that order!) to achieve acceptable outcomes. One of the biggest concerns for water-based resources in the future is the sustainability of the current and future water resource allocation. 

Sustainable Development Goal 6 has a target related to water resources management: "Target 6.5: By 2030, implement integrated water resources management at all levels, including through transboundary cooperation as appropriate."

Sustainable water management 
At present, only about 0.08 percent of all the world's fresh water is accessible. And there is ever-increasing demand for drinking, manufacturing, leisure and agriculture. Due to the small percentage of water available, optimizing the fresh water we have left from natural resources has been a growing challenge around the world.

Much effort in water resource management is directed at optimizing the use of water and in minimizing the environmental impact of water use on the natural environment. The observation of water as an integral part of the ecosystem is based on integrated water resources management, based on the 1992 Dublin Principles (see below). 

Sustainable water management requires a holistic approach based on the principles of Integrated Water Resource Management, originally articulated in 1992 at the Dublin (January) and Rio (July) conferences. The four Dublin Principles, promulgated in the Dublin Statement are:

 Fresh water is a finite and vulnerable resource, essential to sustain life, development and the environment;
 Water development and management should be based on a participatory approach, involving users, planners and policy-makers at all levels;
 Women play a central part in the provision, management and safeguarding of water;
 Water has an economic value in all its competing uses and should be recognized as an economic good.

Implementation of these principles has guided reform of national water management law around the world since 1992.

Further challenges to sustainable and equitable water resources management include the fact that many water bodies are shared across boundaries which may be international (see water conflict) or intra-national (see Murray-Darling basin).

Integrated water resources management

Integrated water resources management (IWRM) has been defined by the Global Water Partnership (GWP) as "a process which promotes the coordinated development and management of water, land and related resources, in order to maximize the resultant economic and social welfare in an equitable manner without compromising the sustainability of vital ecosystems".

Some scholars say that IWRM is complementary to water security because water security is a goal or destination, whilst IWRM is the process necessary to achieve that goal.

IWRM is a paradigm that emerged at international conferences in the late 1900s and early 2000s, although participatory water management institutions have existed for centuries. Discussions on a holistic way of managing water resources began already in the 1950s leading up to the 1977 United Nations Water Conference. The development of IWRM was particularly recommended in the final statement of the ministers at the International Conference on Water and the Environment in 1992, known as the Dublin Statement. This concept aims to promote changes in practices which are considered fundamental to improved water resource management. IWRM was a topic of the second World Water Forum, which was attended by a more varied group of stakeholders than the preceding conferences and contributed to the creation of the GWP.

In the International Water Association definition, IWRM rests upon three principles that together act as the overall framework: 
 Social equity: ensuring equal access for all users (particularly marginalized and poorer user groups) to an adequate quantity and quality of water necessary to sustain human well-being.
 Economic efficiency: bringing the greatest benefit to the greatest number of users possible with the available financial and water resources. 
 Ecological sustainability: requiring that aquatic ecosystems are acknowledged as users and that adequate allocation is made to sustain their natural functioning.
In 2002, the development of IWRM was discussed at the World Summit on Sustainable Development held in Johannesburg, which aimed to encourage the implementation of IWRM at a global level. The third World Water Forum recommended IWRM and discussed information sharing, stakeholder participation, and gender and class dynamics.

IWRM practices depend on context; at the operational level, the challenge is to translate the agreed principles into concrete action.

Operationally, IWRM approaches involve applying knowledge from various disciplines as well as the insights from diverse stakeholders to devise and implement efficient, equitable and sustainable solutions to water and development problems. As such, IWRM is a comprehensive, participatory planning and implementation tool for managing and developing water resources in a way that balances social and economic needs, and that ensures the protection of ecosystems for future generations. In addition, in light of contributing the achievement of Sustainable Development goals (SDGs),  IWRM has been evolving into more sustainable approach as it considers the Nexus approach, which is a cross-sectoral water resource management. The Nexus approach is based on the recognition that "water, energy and food are closely linked through global and local water, carbon and energy cycles or chains."

Water’s many different uses — for agriculture, for healthy ecosystems, for people and livelihoods — demands coordinated action. An IWRM approach is consequently cross-sectoral, aiming to be an open, flexible process, and bringing all stakeholders to the table to set policy and make sound, balanced decisions in response to specific water challenges faced.

An IWRM approach focuses on three basics and aims at avoiding a fragmented approach of water resources management by considering the following aspects: 
 Enabling Environment: A proper enabling environment is essential to both ensure the rights and assets of all stakeholders (individuals as well as public and private sector organizations and companies), and also to protect public assets such as intrinsic environmental values.
 Roles of Institutions:  Institutional development is critical to the formulation and implementation of IWRM policies and programmes. Failure to match responsibilities, authority and capacities for action are all major sources of difficulty with implementing IWRM.  
 Management Instruments: The management instruments for IWRM are the tools and methods that enable and help decision-makers to make rational and informed choices between alternative actions. 
Some of the cross-cutting conditions that are also important to consider when implementing IWRM are: 
 Political will and commitment
 Capacity development
 Adequate investment, financial stability and sustainable cost recovery
 Monitoring and evaluation

IWRM should be viewed as a process rather than a one-shot approach - one that is long-term and iterative rather than linear in nature. As a process which seeks to shift water development and management systems from their currently unsustainable forms, IWRM has no fixed beginnings or endings.

Furthermore, there is not one correct administrative model. The art of IWRM lies in selecting, adjusting and applying the right mix of these tools for a given situation.

Managing water in urban settings

By country
Water resource management and governance is handled differently by different countries. For example, in the United States, the United States Geological Survey (USGS) and its partners monitor water resources, conduct research and inform the public about groundwater quality. Water resources in specific countries are described below:

See also

 Holistic management
 International trade and water
 List of countries by freshwater withdrawal
 List of countries by total renewable water resources
 Peak water 
 Socio-hydrology
 Virtual water
 Water storage

References

External links
Renewable water resources in the world by country
Portal to international hydrology and water resources
 Cap-Net, Network for Capacity Building in Sustainable Water Management
 CKnet-INA, Indonesian Integrated Water Resource Management Secretariat
 Sustainable Sanitation and Water Management Toolbox

Aquatic ecology
Hydrology
Irrigation
Natural resources
Resources
Water and the environment
Water management
Resources
Water resources management
Water industry
Sanitation